A list of films produced by the Bollywood film industry based in Mumbai in 1963:

Highest-grossing films
The ten highest-grossing films at the Indian Box Office in 1963:

A-B

C-F

G-J

K-M

N-R

S-Z

References

External links
 Bollywood films of 1963 at the Internet Movie Database
 Indian Film Songs from the Year 1963 - A look back at 1963 with a special focus on Hindi film songs

1963
Bollywood
Films, Bollywood